Aloysius Maria Benziger (also known as Alois Benziger) was a Swiss Catholic bishop, pioneer missionary, and Carmelite Father who lived from 1864 to 1942. He served as the Bishop of Quilon, Titular Bishop of Tabae, and Titular Archbishop of Antinoë.

Early years and Formation
Aloysius Maria Benziger was born in Einsiedeln, Switzerland on January 31, 1864. His father was a distinguished citizen of the Swiss republic, a major in the army and the owner of a publishing house. His mother, Anna Maria née Koch, originally from Boswil, was the daughter of a farmer, and she had six children, of whom four were sons and two daughters. Alois's first name was Adelrich and Benziger was his family name. When he joined the Carmelite first order, he took the name Aloysius Maria Benziger. Benziger went to primary school in Einsiedeln and then spent two years at the Benedictine abbey school. On the death of his elder brother, Louis Benziger, destined to take over the family business, in 1878, his father sent him to a business school in Frankfurt. Additionally, he took private lessons in theology and history from Johannes Janssen, a priest and historian. Likewise, he met Joseph Hergenröther in Frankfurt, a church historian who would later become a cardinal, and he chose him to be his confessor. The young student was greatly influenced by both of these people, and the desire to become a priest awoke in him. The father first objected to this request, so he sent his son to Downside College in Bath, England, to study languages after boarding school at the Institute Saint-Louis in Brussels.

The young Benziger had made up his mind to become a priest. He had met with the Discalced Carmelite order in Brussels and desired to join them. He joined the Bruges Carmelite convent in 1884 against his father's wishes, and on May 28, 1885, he professed his vows there, taking the name Alosiyus Maria Benziger. On December 22, 1888, Benziger was ordained as a priest at the St. Bavo Cathedral in Ghent.

References

1864 births
1942 deaths